The Eccentrics (Sherekilebi; , Chudaki) is a 1973 Soviet satire-comedy film directed by Eldar Shengelaia.

Cast
Vasili Chkhaidze as Qristepore
Demno Jgenti as Ertaozi
Ariadna Shengelaia as Margalita 
Boris Tsipuria as Khuta, a policeman
Abrek Pkhaladze as Noshrevani
Merab Eliozishvili as Triponi
Akaki Bakradze as Mizana 
Grigol Tkabladze as Priest

References

External links

1973 films
1973 comedy-drama films
Soviet comedy-drama films
Georgian-language films
Kartuli Pilmi films
Films directed by Eldar Shengelaia
Soviet-era films from Georgia (country)
Comedy films from Georgia (country)
Russian satirical films
1970s satirical films
Multilingual films from Georgia (country)
Soviet multilingual films